Georgina Hope Rinehart  (née Hancock, born 9 February 1954) is an Australian billionaire mining magnate and businesswoman. Rinehart is the Executive Chairman of Hancock Prospecting, a privately owned mineral exploration and extraction company founded by her father, Lang Hancock.

Rinehart was born in Perth, Western Australia, and spent her early years in the Pilbara region. She boarded at St Hilda's Anglican School for Girls and then briefly studied at the University of Sydney, dropping out to work with her father at Hancock Prospecting. She was Lang Hancock's only child, and when he died in 1992leaving a bankrupt estateshe succeeded him as executive chairman. She turned a company with severe financial difficulties into the largest private company in Australia and one of the largest mining houses in the world.

When Rinehart took over Hancock Prospecting, its total wealth was estimated at 75 million, which did not account for group liabilities and contingent liabilities. She oversaw an expansion of the company over the following decade, and due to the iron ore boom of the early 2000s became a nominal billionaire in 2006. In the 2010s, Rinehart began to expand her holdings into areas outside the mining industry. She made sizeable investments in Ten Network Holdings and Fairfax Media (although she sold her interest in the latter in 2015), and also expanded into agriculture, buying several cattle stations, divesting them within a decade.

Rinehart is Australia’s richest person. Her wealth reached around 29 billion in 2012, at which point she overtook Christy Walton as the world's richest woman and was included on the Forbes list of The World's 100 Most Powerful Women. Rinehart's net worth dropped significantly over the following few years due to a slowdown in the Australian mining sector. Forbes estimated her net worth in 2019 at 14.8 billion as published in the list of Australia's 50 richest people. However, her wealth was rebuilt again during 2020 due to increased demand for Australian iron ore, so that by May 2021, her net worth as published in the 2021 Financial Review Rich List was estimated in excess of  30 billion; while in March 2021, The Australian Business Review stated her wealth equalled 36.28 billion.  Forbes considered Rinehart one of the world's ten richest women. Rinehart was Australia's wealthiest person from 2011 to 2015, according to both Forbes and The Australian Financial Review; and again in 2020 and 2021, according to The Australian Business Review and The Australian Financial Review.

Early life and family
Rinehart was born on 9 February 1954 at St John of God Subiaco Hospital in Perth, Western Australia. She is the only child of Hope Margaret Nicholas and Lang Hancock. Her family then moved to Mulga Downs station in the Pilbara. Later Rinehart boarded at St Hilda's Anglican School for Girls in Perth. She briefly studied economics at the University of Sydney, before dropping out and working for her father, gaining an extensive knowledge of the Pilbara iron-ore industry. Rinehart rebuilt the HPPL company to become one of the most successful private companies in Australia's history.

In 1973, at age 19, Rinehart met Englishman Greg Milton while both were working in Wittenoom. At this time Milton changed his surname to an earlier family name Hayward. Their children John Langley and Bianca Hope were born in 1976 and 1977 respectively. The couple separated in 1979 and divorced in 1981. In 1983, she married corporate lawyer and Arco executive, Frank Rinehart, in Las Vegas. They had two children, Hope and Ginia, born in 1986 and 1987 respectively. Frank Rinehart received a scholarship to Harvard for his services in the then US Army air Corp. He was top of Harvard College, and then top of Harvard Law School, while also studying engineering, and holding a full-time and two part time jobs. Frank Rinehart died in 1990.

Rinehart and, Rose Porteous, Lang Hancock’s estranged wife then widow, who married Willie Porteous soon after his passing, were involved in an acrimonious legal fight from 1992 over Hancock's death and bankrupt estate. The ordeal ultimately took 14 years to settle. With HPPL retaining the mining tenements, Mrs Porteous had endeavored to allege did not belong to the company.

In 1999, the Western Australian state government approved a proposal to name a mountain range in honour of her family.

In 2003, at age 27, Rinehart's son John changed his surname by deed poll from his birth name Hayward to Hancock, his maternal grandfather's name. Since 2014, Rinehart has had a difficult relationship with her son, John; and was not present at his wedding to Gemma Ludgate. John's sister, Bianca Hope Rinehart, who was once positioned to take over the family business, served as a director of Hancock Prospecting and HMHT Investments until 31 October 2011, when she was replaced by her half-sister, Ginia Rinehart. In 2013, Bianca married her partner Sasha Serebryakov, she married in Hawaii; and Rinehart did not attend the wedding. Rinehart's other daughter, Hope, married Ryan Welker, and they divorced while living in New York. Rinehart attended both her younger daughters' weddings.

Business career

After the death of her father in March 1992, Rinehart became Executive Chairman of Hancock Prospecting Pty Limited (HPPL) and the HPPL Group of companies. All companies within the group are privately-owned. With the notable exception of receiving a royalty stream from Hamersley Iron since the late 1960s, Lang Hancock's mining activities were mainly related to exploration and the accumulation of vast mining leases. The BBC journalist, Nick Bryant, argues that while Rinehart was a beneficiary of her father's royalty deals, she "transformed the family business by spotting, early than most, the vast potential of the China market."

Rinehart  achieved the Roy Hill tenements in 1993, the year after her father’s death, having applied for them five months after her father’s passing, and focused on developing Roy Hill And Hancock Prospective undeveloped deposits, raising capital through joint venture partnerships and turning the leases into revenue producing mines.

Hancock Prospecting, now owns 50 per cent of Hope Downs and shares of 50 per cent of the profits generated by the 4 Hope Downs mine, which is operated by Rio Tinto under a joint management committee and produces 47 million tonnes of iron ore annually. Another joint venture with Mineral Resources at Nicholas Downs, northwest of Newman, is producing 500 million tonnes of ferruginous manganese. Majority stakes in the Alpha Coal and Kevin's Corner coal projects in Central Queensland were sold to GVK in 2011. After receiving approval from the Commonwealth Minister for the Environment in 2012, these coal projects were subsequently not developed. The Roy Hill Iron ore project, south of Port headline, in the Pilbara produces 60 million tonnes a year, with approvals pending to reach 70 million tonnes per annum.

In 2010 Rinehart took a 10 per cent stake in Ten Network Holdings; James Packer had acquired an 18 per cent stake in the same company shortly before. Since then she also acquired a substantial stake in Fairfax Media. Rinehart was a major player in the media and no longer limits her interests to the mining business. In February 2012 she increased her stake in Fairfax to over 12 per cent, and became the largest shareholder of the company. Fairfax journalists were reportedly fearful that she wanted to turn them into a "mouthpiece for the mining industry". In June 2012, she increased her stake further to 18.67 per cent, and was believed to be seeking three board seats and involvement in editorial decisions in Fairfax's newspaper division. Negotiations between Fairfax and Hancock Prospecting broke down in late June because of disagreements over Fairfax's editorial independence policy and other issues relating to board governance; chair Roger Corbett subsequently announced that Rinehart would not be offered any seats on the board. After failing to get board representation she sold her shareholding in 2015.

In 2015, Rinehart was listed as the 37 most powerful woman in the world by Forbes; a decline from her 2014 and 2013 rankings as the 27 and the 16 most powerful woman, respectively.

Later the same year Rinehart acquired Fossil Downs Station after it was placed on the market for the first time in 133 years. The  property was stocked with 15,000 head of cattle and the sale price was not disclosed, but estimated to be between 25 to 30 million. Rinehart had acquired a 50% stake in Liveringa and Nerrima Stations in 2014 for 40 million in 2014.

In October 2015, Rinehart planned to open the huge Roy Hill mine just eight months after she secured 7.9 billion in funding. Initial shipments of iron ore were sent to China. In October 2016 it was announced that Hancock Prospecting had struck a deal to invest in AIM listed UK-based mining company Sirius Minerals to help bring to fruition their North Yorkshire Polyhalite Project.

Political activities

In the 1970s, Rinehart was an active supporter of the Westralian Secession Movement, which her father had founded to work for the secession of Western Australia from the rest of the country. She also had some involvement with the Workers Party (later renamed the Progress Party), a libertarian organisation founded by businessman John Singleton.

Rinehart opposed the Rudd government's Mineral Resource Rent Tax and Carbon Pollution Reduction Scheme as part of a group of mining magnates that included Andrew Forrest. She founded the lobby group ANDEV, ("Australians for Northern Development and Economic Vision") and has sponsored the trips of prominent climate change denier Christopher Monckton to Australia. In October 2021, Rinehart garnered controversy after expressing climate change denialist views during a speech at her childhood primary school.

Since 2010 Rinehart has been actively promoting the cause of development of Australia's north and has spoken, written articles and published a book on this topic. Rinehart stresses that Australia must do more to welcome investment and improve its cost competitiveness, particularly when Australia faces record debt.  She advocates a special economic zone in the North with reduced taxation and less regulations and has enlisted the support of many prominent Australians, plus the Institute of Public Affairs. In a 2012 article in the Australian Resources and Investment Magazine, Rinehart said that if people wanted to have more money they should "stop whingeing" and "Do something to make more money yourself − spend less time drinking or smoking and socialising, and more time working". She criticised what she saw as the "socialist" policies of the Australian Government of "high taxes" and "excessive regulation".

In a video posted to the Sydney Mining Club's YouTube channel on 23 August 2012, Rinehart expressed concern for Australia's economic competitiveness noting how "Indeed if we competed in the Olympic Games as sluggishly as we compete economically, there would be an outcry." She said "Furthermore, Africans want to work and its workers are willing to work for less than two dollars a day. Such statistics make me worry for this country's future." Rinehart's views were dismissed by the Australian Prime Minister, Julia Gillard, who said that "It's not the Australian way to toss people $2, to toss them a gold coin, and then ask them to work for a day" and that "we support proper Australian wages and decent working conditions." The Australian Deputy Prime Minister and Treasurer, Wayne Swan, described Rinehart's statement as an "insult to the millions of Australian workers who go to work and slog it out to feed the kids and pay the bills."

Rinehart is a supporter of Donald Trump.

Hope Margaret Hancock Trust 

In 1988, Lang Hancock established the Hope Margaret Hancock Trust, nominating Rinehart as trustee, with his four grandchildren named as beneficiaries. Gina Rinehart was appointed to run the trust until the youngest of her four children, Ginia Rinehart, turned 25 in 2011.

In 2011, Rinehart's daughter, Hope Rinehart Welker, commenced a commercial action in the New South Wales Supreme Court for reasons understood to be related to the conduct of the trustee. The action sought to remove Rinehart as sole trustee. Her brother, John, and sister, Bianca, were later revealed as parties to the dispute.

In an agreement reached between the parties, the Court granted an interim non-publication order in September 2011. In making the interim order, Justice Paul Brereton stated: "This is not the first occasion of discord in the family, which has immense wealth, no small part of which resides in the trust. In the past, the affairs of the family, including such discord, has attracted considerable publicity in the media." Then, in a judgement handed down on 7 October 2011, Justice Brereton stated that he intended to dismiss an application by Rinehart, that there be a stay on court action, and that the family be directed into mediation. In December 2011, three justices of the NSW Court of Appeal lifted the suppression orders on the case. However, a stay was granted until 3 February 2012 and extended by the High Court of Australia until 9 March 2012. Rinehart's application for suppression was supported by Ginia Rinehart, but was opposed by Hope, John and Bianca. A subsequent application by Rinehart for a non-publication order on the grounds of fear of personal and family safety was dismissed by the NSW Supreme Court on 2 February 2012. In March 2012, when the suppression order was lifted, it was revealed that Rinehart had delayed the vesting date of the trust, which had prompted the court action by her three older children.

Rinehart stood down as trustee during the hearing in October 2013. While Rinehart's lawyers subsequently declared any legal matters closed, John and Bianca's legal representatives proceeded with a trial in the NSW Supreme Court to deal with allegations of misconduct. The Court handed down its decision on 28 May 2015 in which Bianca was appointed as the new trustee.

Net worth

Rinehart is one of Australia's richest people, with Forbes estimating her net worth in 2019 at 14.8 billion as published in the list of Australia's 50 richest people, and The Australian Financial Review estimating her net worth in 2021 at 31.06 billion—the wealthiest Australian as published in the 2021 Financial Review Rich List. Forbes considers Rinehart one of the world's richest women.

Rinehart first appeared on the 1992 Financial Review Rich List (at the time called the BRW Rich 200, published annually in the BRW magazine, following the death of her father earlier that year. She has appeared every year since, and became a billionaire in 2006. Due to Australia's mining boom in the early 21st century, Rinehart's wealth increased significantly since 2010, and she diversified investments into media, taking holdings in Ten Network Holdings and Fairfax Media. According to BRW, she became Australia's richest woman in 2010, and Australia's richest person in 2011, and the first woman to lead the list. During 2012, BRW claimed Rinehart was the world's richest woman, surpassing Wal-Mart owner Christy Walton.

In 2007, she first appeared on Forbes Asia Australia's 40 Richest, with an estimated wealth of 1 billion; more than doubling that the next year to 2.4 billion; and then, in spite of the global financial crisis, by 2011 had more than trebled to 9 billion; doubled again in 2012 to 18 billion; a slight reduction in 2013 to 17 billion; and a slight increase in 2014 to 17.6 billion. While still Australia's richest person, her wealth had reduced to 12.3 billion by 2015 according to Forbes, and in 2016 Forbes assessed her net worth at 8.5 billion, placing her second on the list. Releasing the results in February 2011, Forbes was the first to name her as Australia's richest person; with BRW conferring the same title in May that year.

In June 2011, Citigroup estimated that she was on course to overtake Carlos Slim, the Mexican magnate worth 74 billion and Bill Gates, who is worth 56 billion, mainly because she owns her companies outright. Using a price-to-earnings ratio of 11:1 that applied at that time to her business partner, Rio Tinto, the Australian internet business news service, SmartCompany, stated: "It is possible to see Rinehart's portfolio of coal and iron ore production spinning off annual profits approaching 10 billion", giving her a "personal net worth valuation of more than 100 billion".

In January 2012, there were further media reports that Rinehart's estimated wealth has increased to 20 billion following estimates that the Roy Hill project was notionally valued at 10 billion. Forbes magazine ranked her as the fourth-richest woman in 2012 with 18 billion; the fifth-richest woman in 2013 with 17 billion; and the sixth-richest woman in 2014 with 17.6 billion. In 2012, BRW estimated her wealth at 29.17 billion, with Ivan Glasenberg being her closest rival, with net wealth estimated at 7.4 billion. At the time, BRW stated that it was possible Rinehart would become the first person with a net wealth of 100 billion. , according to the Bloomberg Billionaires Index, Rinehart was the 37th-richest person in the world, with an estimated net worth of 18.6 billion.

Rinehart's wealth rankings between 2013 and 2019 were adversely impacted by the fall in the wholesale iron ore price and the fall in the AUD/USD exchange rate. In May 2016, she had fallen from wealthiest Australian in 2011 to fourth, with 6.06 billion, surpassed by property developer Harry Triguboff, with 10.62 billion. By 2020, according to The Australian Financial Review, Rinehart had an estimated net worth of 28.89 billion and was restored to the mantle of the wealthiest Australian; it was a title that she maintained in 2021, with an estimated net worth of 31.06 billion.

Wealth rankings

Philanthropy 
In a 2006 Business Review Weekly article reviewing the way Australia's rich support philanthropy, it was noted that Rinehart prefers to keep a low profile, partly to avoid being "harassed by other charities" and partly for reasons of privacy. Rinehart is publicly known for visiting girls' orphanages in Cambodia and is on the expert advisory board of SISHA, a Cambodian non-profit organisation campaigning against human trafficking, in particular by rescuing and assisting sexually exploited women and children.

In 2012 Swimming Australia announced a $10 million funding arrangement over 4 years with the Georgina Hope Foundation in conjunction with Hancock Prospecting. The deal supports the Australian Swim Team through direct payments to elite and targeted development swimmers, as well supporting lesser known sports such as synchronised swimming. The arrangement was renewed for a further 2 years in August 2015 and includes naming rights to various Swimming Australia events, including the Australian Swimming Championships. As recently as 2019, the sporting group described Rinehart as “part of [the] team” and “part of the swimming family.".  In 2016 Rinehart also began to sponsor the Australian Rowing Team with a significant investment to improve direct financial athlete assistance for the Rio Olympic Games as well as for the four years, leading into the 2020 Tokyo Olympics. It is understood that the deal now also extends to Paris 2024.  This further investment is said to make Rinehart the largest individual donor to Olympic sport in Australian history.

Awards
In 2022, Rinehart was appointed as an Officer of the Order of Australia (AO) in the 2022 Australia Day Honours for "distinguished service to the mining sector, to the community through philanthropic initiatives, and to sport as a patron".

References

Further reading

External links
Video portrait on ABC's Hungry Beast [content blocked outside Australia.]

1954 births
Living people
Australian billionaires
Australian chairpersons of corporations
Australian mining businesspeople
Australian women in business
Female billionaires
Lang Hancock family
Officers of the Order of Australia
People educated at St Hilda's Anglican School for Girls
People from Perth, Western Australia
Women business executives
Women in mining